FairVote, formerly the Center for Voting and Democracy, is a 501(c)(3) organization that advocates electoral reform in the United States.

Founded in 1992 as Citizens for Proportional Representation to support the implementation of proportional representation in American elections, the organization in 1993 became the Center for Voting and Democracy and in 2004 changed its name to FairVote to reflect its support of such proposals as instant-runoff voting (IRV), for single and multi-winner elections, a national popular vote for president, a right-to-vote amendment to the Constitution, and universal voter registration. FairVote releases regular publications on the state of the U.S. electoral system, including Dubious Democracy and Monopoly Politics.

Notable members of FairVote's board of directors have included its past chairs, former Nirvana bassist Krist Novoselic and former Congressman and 1980 independent presidential candidate John Anderson.

About

Founding
FairVote was founded as Citizens for Proportional Representation (CPR) in 1992 in Cincinnati, Ohio, by a diverse group of scholars, grassroots activists, civic leaders, and politicians.

The result of a merger of several smaller groups promoting proportional representation reform into a single, nationalized advocacy group. Early leaders included Robert Richie as executive director, Matthew Cossolotto as president and Steven Hill as western regional director. John Anderson was head of its national advisory board and in 1992 published a New York Times commentary advocating IRV in presidential elections. The CPR ended its founding year operating in Alexandria, Virginia, with around 200 members.

History and timeline

Since its founding, FairVote has expanded its reach and expressed its platforms to both the public and all levels of government through campaigns, blogs, newsletters, lobbying, interviews, amicus curiae briefs, and numerous media outlets. Notable events include:

1992: Ted Berry, the first African-American mayor of Cincinnati, conducts a welcoming speech at the CPR opening convention. Berry was a firm supporter of proportional representation and fought in the 1980s and 1990s to reinstate the practice in Cincinnati after its repeal in 1957.
1993: Citizens for Proportional Representation changes its name to the Center for Voting and Democracy to reflect support of other reforms, such as IRV and universal voter registration. The Center for Voting and Democracy relocates to Washington, D.C.
1994: Robert Richie appears on national radio to explain a federal judge's ruling that cumulative voting be used to settle a voting rights case in Cane vs. Worcester County, M.D. The Center for Voting and Democracy releases the first Dubious Democracy, its biannual report on the state of democracy in congressional elections.
1996: Steven Hill runs the first campaign for electoral system reform in the US for several decades, a voter initiative to pass preference voting (proportional representation) in San Francisco. The campaign loses, 54-46%, but sets the stage for future victories.
1997: The Center releases Monopoly Politics, a report on the undemocratic elements of the single winner plurality system. The center's news conference is filmed on C-SPAN, and Rob Richie's opinion appears in The New York Times.
1999: IRV for statewide elections passes in the New Mexico State Senate.
2002: Led by western regional director Steven Hill, San Francisco becomes the first major city to pass a voter initiative, 54-46%, to adopt IRV for certain citywide elections
2002: Steven Hill's book Fixing Elections: the Failure of American's Winner Take All Elections is published, making the case for electoral system reform in the United States.
2004: San Francisco becomes the first city since Ann Arbor, Michigan, in 1975 to use IRV in public elections, after suing recalcitrant city officials to compel compliance with the law.
2005: Arkansas institutes IRV for overseas military voters
2006: South Carolina institutes IRV for military and overseas voters and Oakland and Minneapolis pass it for city elections
2007: Maryland becomes the first state to pass the National Popular Vote plan for president
2010: Oakland, Berkeley and San Leandro, California, all use IRV for the first time to elect local offices. 
2012: Robert Richie writes for The Huffington Post supporting a national popular vote for president
2013: Robert Richie coauthors the fourth edition of Every Vote Equal, a book explaining and supporting the National Popular Vote Interstate Compact
2014: New York lawmakers pass a national popular vote bill that will award the state's electoral votes to the candidate who receives the majority of the popular vote
2015: FairVote co-hosts with the Washington College of Law a "Democracy Slam" with NBC's Chuck Todd and other leading journalists and professors, with its key reforms receiving high ratings.
2016: Maine becomes the first state to adopt IRV statewide, with FairVote and FairVote Maine arm involved in the campaign.
 2017: Congressman Don Beyer introduces the Fair Representation Act at an event organized by FairVote. FairVote New Mexico wins a lawsuit to keep Santa Fe on track to implement RCV in 2018.
 2018: Maine voters uphold RCV for congressional and primary elections, and Utah passes a law enabling cities to use RCV, with two cities opting to do so in 2019.
 2019: New York City adopts RCV, and the Democratic National Committee approves use of RCV ballots in five party-run presidential primaries and caucuses in 2020.
 2020: The state of Alaska and six cities pass ballot measures on RCV.

FairVote is headquartered in Takoma Park, Maryland.

Mission
The stated mission of FairVote is "a nonpartisan champion of electoral reforms that give voters greater choice, a stronger voice, and a representative democracy that works for all Americans."

FairVote concentrates its efforts on electoral reform in the United States through research, education, outreach, and support of policies that foster equal representation and greater transparency within the electoral administration.

The organization's projects fall into three broad categories: fair access to participation, fair elections, and fair representation. To that end, it sponsors programs like the Democracy Secretary of State (SoS) Project, which scrutinizes practices obstructing the voting process while proposing solutions to hold electoral officials accountable for their actions. The Promote Our Vote project focuses on local ideas to spur participation.

Members of FairVote regularly write blogs, provide commentary in interviews, and offer internships for interested youth.

Public perception

General coverage

FairVote has been covered by many major news outlets, including The Washington Post, The New York Times, and NPR, which tend to call it a nonpartisan voting rights advocacy group. Other commonly used terms include: "voting rights organization", "election reform advocacy group", "national reform organization", and "election participation and reform group". The Denver Post referred to the group as "election-protection campaigners".

Alleged liberal bias

In his New York Times profile of FairVote co-founder Steven Hill, Scott James called FairVote a "left-wing group". Other writers have claimed that many FairVote policies, such as IRV, are popular in "liberal enclaves" and supported by "populist groups" such as Common Cause, an advocacy organization, and thus give the group a liberal tilt. Louis Jacobson, a writer for Roll Call, argues that any group supporting the National Popular Vote Interstate Compact will be perceived as liberal-leaning because of Democratic frustration with the Electoral College after the 2000 Presidential Election. But Rob Richie, FairVote's president, has said, "[FairVote] is definitely not a Democratic stalking horse." In addition, FairVote points to John Anderson, who was president of the organization's first advisory board and a current member of the Board of Directors, who ran for president as an Independent in 1980. In fact, before Anderson ran for president, he was a Republican Congressman from Illinois.

Proposed reforms
Released in 2013, Reform 2020 is a set of four major reform goals

Fair Representation Voting
Ranked Choice Voting
Constitutional Right to Vote
National Popular Vote

Electoral procedure

FairVote advocates the use of instant-runoff voting (IRV) in single-winner elections. Under this system, voters rank candidates in order of preference, in contrast to the more widely used plurality voting system. FairVote has spread the term "ranked-choice voting" (RCV) in the United States to describe single transferable vote and instant-runoff voting; the organization opposes Condorcet electoral systems, which are also ranked-choice voting systems.

In 2002, FairVote backed a San Francisco ballot initiative amending Section 13.102 of the city charter to allow IRV in local elections. The city began using IRV to elect local officials on November 2, 2004. Subsequent ballot initiatives supported by FairVote have allowed the use of IRV in the following cities (listed with first year of use):

Takoma Park, Maryland (2007)
Minneapolis, Minnesota (2009)
Oakland, California, Berkeley and San Leandro (2010)
Portland, Maine (2010)
San Leandro, California (2010)
St. Paul, Minnesota (2011)
Springfield, Illinois (2011)
Telluride, Colorado (2011)
Memphis, Tennessee (not yet implemented)
Santa Fe, New Mexico (2018)

FairVote supports modification of state laws governing the Electoral College so that the president is elected by national popular vote. FairVote advocates the National Popular Vote Interstate Compact, an agreement among states and the District of Columbia to award their electoral votes to the candidate with the highest popular vote total in all 50 states and DC. FairVote has played an active role in lobbying state officials to join the compact. New York Assemblyman Fred Thiele said he first proposed New York's entrance into the compact after being approached by FairVote.

FairVote advocates the use of proportional representation (which they call "fair representation voting") in multi-seat assembly and council elections throughout the United States. In this system, each candidate or party controls a share of seats equal to its share of the vote. The organization has proposed combining several congressional districts into one to allow for proportional representation in the United States Congress, as well as in the California and Michigan state assemblies. They advocate for several PR systems, including STV (which they also call "Ranked Choice Voting"), cumulative voting, unordered open list ("Open Ticket Voting"), SNTV ("Single-Vote Method"), and MMP ("Districts Plus").

Voting rights

FairVote has backed the proposed Right to Vote Amendment (House Joint Resolution 44), sponsored by Representatives Mark Pocan (D-WI) and Keith Ellison (D-MN), under which citizens would be guaranteed a constitutional right to vote. FairVote filed a policy brief in support of the legislation, stating, "We believe that the right to vote is a cornerstone of representative democracy that depends upon broadly defined voter eligibility, universal voter access to the polls, and election integrity." FairVote has also advocated universal voter registration, a system in which all citizens of legal voting age would be registered to vote automatically.

Research and reports

Election research
FairVote has conducted research on both presidential and Congressional elections. Most of its presidential election research focuses on the electoral college's effects on campaigning. In its 2012 Presidential Election analysis, FairVote documented the large disparity in both time and money spent in swing states (e.g., Florida) versus safe states (e.g., Maryland). In addition, FairVote has begun publishing data on how much time sitting presidents spend in swing states.

FairVote releases two main documents of Congressional research every election cycle. The first is "Monopoly Politics", which contains predictions and analysis for each race. FairVote first categorizes each seat according to its competitiveness; seats are labeled Safe Democratic, Likely Democratic, Lean Democratic, Toss Up, Lean Republican, Likely Republican, or Safe Republican. Relatedly, FairVote gives each district a partisanship ranking derived from previous elections. FairVote then predicts what percentage of the vote candidates will receive. Lastly, the research tries to predict incumbent winning percentages for the election cycle. For example, FairVote expects incumbents to do 4.5% better in 2014 than they did in 2012.

The second major document is "Dubious Democracy", an assessment of Congressional elections' fairness. By aggregating Congressional race data since 1982, the research attempts to highlight several elements of Congressional elections—the ratio of competitive to noncompetitive districts, the effects of gerrymandering, and voter turnout—that FairVote believes hurt the democratic process. In the report, every Congressional race is placed on a scale of competitiveness, from Tight (<5% margin of victory) to No Contest (>40% margin of victory), and the percentage of races within each category is tracked over time. In addition, the research tracks voter turnout and wasted votes over time. Lastly, the report follows the success of incumbents in winning reelection over time.

In addition to Monopoly Politics and Dubious Democracy, after the 2010 midterm elections FairVote released data on the effect of third-party and spoiler candidates. The report found that there were many districts in which the winning candidate did not receive a majority of the vote, a fact the group finds problematic. In addition, the research highlighted races in which Independents garnered a sizable percentage of the vote.

Finally, FairVote created Representation 2020, a project that hopes to achieve parity in the numbers of men and women serving in elected office. The project has three main goals: institutionalizing changes in party rules to recruit and train more women to run for office, creating family-friendly legislative schedules, and replacing single-member districts with multi-member districts with proportional representation. Representation2020 has since become a separate nonprofit called RepresentWomen; it is still closely aligned with FairVote.

Voting rights

FairVote has created two projects that aim to expand and protect voting rights in the United States. The first, Promote Our Vote, tries to provide support and resources for groups focused on expanding voting rights. The group provides electoral research, legal analysis, and communications assistance. In addition, Promote Our Vote creates support for a constitutional right to vote amendment by building up support at the local level, focusing mainly on college campuses.

The second project is Democracy SoS, which aims to familiarize voters with the important role of state-level Secretary of State officials. To that end, the project has issued reports on state election preparedness, interviewed state election officials, and published voter guides that focus on election reform policies. The project also hopes to popularize its candidate surveys, which include questions about election planning and election integrity.

Involvement in court cases
FairVote has participated in a number of recent court cases as amici curiae to advance fair representation voting, particularly under the California and federal Voting Rights Act. Notable recent cases in which they have been involved include:

Sanchez v. City of Modesto (2007)
Sanchez v. City of Modesto (2007) dealt with the constitutionality of the California Voting Rights Act of 2001 (CVRA).

After the California Superior Court of Stanislaus County declared the CVRA unconstitutional in favor of the City of Modesto, plaintiffs Enrique Sanchez, Emma Pinedo and Salvador Vera appealed to the Fifth Appellate District of the Court of Appeal of California.

Along with Kathay Feng from the organization California Common Cause, FairVote submitted an amicus curiae brief in favor of the plaintiffs.

FairVote argued that winner-take-all at-large voting systems caused "vote dilutions in jurisdictions affected by racially polarized voting, even where minority voters cannot form a majority in a single member district."

Supporting the CVRA, FairVote viewed the law requiring courts to "fashion effective remedies to cure vote dilution affecting smaller and dispersed minority populations."

Asserting that the CVRA allows California to become more representative of the people, FairVote concluded that the CVRA was an important and constitutional piece of government reform.  The Court of Appeal applied rational basis review to CVRA and declared the law constitutional, reversing the lower court's decision.

United States v. Village of Port Chester (2008)

In December 2006, the United States Department of Justice alleged that Port Chester's at-large system of electing its board of trustees violated Section 2 of the Voting Rights Act of 1965. The US government claimed that the at-large electoral system denied the Hispanic population "an equal opportunity to participate in the political process and to elect representatives of their choice."

In United States v. Village of Port Chester (2008), US District Judge Stephen Robinson of the United States District Court for the Southern District of New York issued a decision that the Village's election system violated the Voting Rights Act and ordered remedial plans from all parties.

The Defendants of the case, the Village of Port Chester, proposed cumulative voting as a remedy, which "allows citizens to cast multiple votes for a given candidate for a given seat."

In 2007, the Brennan Center, representing FairVote as amicus curiae, submitted a brief supporting cumulative voting as a remedy, but also proposing another system known as "choice voting", a process of ranking candidates. FairVote argued that "cumulative and choice voting avoid the necessity for deliberately drawing districts along racial lines" and that a winner-take-all system would not allow the Hispanic minority population to gain representation.

FairVote also argued that cumulative voting is appropriate under the Voting Rights Act, as it "ensures the equal principle of "one-person, one vote"", is race-neutral, and that it is supported by case law and history. On November 6, 2009, the Court did not accept choice voting but accepted Port Chester's remedy of cumulative voting. On June 16, 2010, Port Chester elected its first Latino to the Board of Trustees.

Minnesota Voters Alliance v. City of Minneapolis (2009)

FairVote Minnesota is an independent ally of FairVote.

FairVote Minnesota, siding with the City of Minneapolis, served as intervenor-respondent in Minnesota Voters Alliance v. City of Minneapolis, a case that was attested at the Minnesota Supreme Court.

Minnesota Voters Alliance v. City of Minneapolis dealt with the constitutionality of IRV, which was adopted by the City of Minneapolis for its municipal elections.

Minnesota Voters Alliance, a non-profit organization who served as the appellants, argued that the "method violates their right to vote, to associate for political purposes, and to equal protection under both the United States and the Minnesota Constitutions".

Siding with the city, FairVote Minnesota stated that instant-runoff voting (IRV) is a form of RCV that allowed voters to rank multiple candidates on a single ballot. They argued that this form of voting had legitimate policy reasons such as simplifying the election process, saving money, increasing voter turn-out, ensuring more diverse representation, and promoting civil election campaigns.

In their defense of the City of Minneapolis, FairVote argued that the appellants bore a "heavy burden of persuasion" because they brought a facial challenge to the constitutionality of IRV" and that "Minneapolis IRV is constitutional because it is supported by legitimate interests, imposes no burden on the right to vote, and applies to all voters".

The Court affirmed the lower district court's ruling that IRV did not infringe on the appellants' constitutional rights, thus rejecting the Minnesota Voters Alliance's challenge to IRV. After the result, Jeanne Massey, executive director of FairVote Minnesota, applauded the Minnesota Supreme Court decision and stated that the Court "blazed a path that every community in our state can follow toward better elections and a stronger democracy" and that the decision was "a resounding endorsement of ranked choice voting".

Jauregi v. City of Palmdale (2014)

Juan Jauregui, the plaintiff, filed a complaint in April 2012 alleging that Palmdale's at-large method of electing members to its City Council resulted in vote dilution for Latino and African American residents.

The lawsuit claimed that Palmdale's at-large method denied minority residents effective political participation and thus violated the California Voting Rights Act (CVRA). The case was brought up to Judge Mooney of the Superior Court of the State of California in the County of Los Angeles.

In July 2013, Judge Mooney declared that the CVRA vested the court in implementing appropriate remedies in favor of the plaintiffs.

The City of Palmdale immediately appealed the decision, reasoning that in 2001 Palmdale residents voted for an at-large election system. The case reached the California Court of Appeal in the Second Appellate District.

In January 2014, FairVote submitted an amicus curiae brief in support of the plaintiffs.

FairVote argued that fair representation voting, unlike at-large systems, enhanced minority groups to elect at least one candidate of their choice. FairVote advocated for a number of alternative methods, such as ranked choice voting, single voting, and cumulative voting.

However, the City of Palmdale opposed FairVote's participation, arguing that the amicus brief "threatens significant prejudice to the City" as it would continue to delay the certification of the city's November 2013 election. The California Court of Appeal has denied FairVote's application to file as amicus curiae.

References

Electoral reform groups in the United States
Non-profit organizations based in Maryland
Organizations established in 1992
1992 establishments in Ohio